Richart de Semilli (floruit late 12th or early 13th century) was a trouvère, probably from Paris, which he mentions three times in his extant works. These number ten in one chansonnier (with a few also copied into related manuscripts), and one anonymous song, "", which has sometimes been attributed to him by modern scholars, but of which most of the first strophe and music are missing.

Unusually for a trouvère, Richart used the same poetic structure and melody for his "" and "", and also for "" and "". Even within his pieces his melodies make heavy use of repetition, another departure from what was typical of the trouvères. "" uses one phrase and a variant, while "" uses three phrases and their variants for eleven lines. This last piece, along with "" and "", each use variations of the last melodic lines three times. All his melodies are simple, with "" being the most ornate. None survive in mensural notation, but this has not prevented the suggestion that "" is in the second mode. For his other pieces, Richart preferred the authentic D mode and plagal F mode. "" and "" are rotrouenges.

Several of Richart's pieces were used as models by other trouvères. "" and "" served as models for an anonymous song about the Virgin Mary, "". "" was a model for the anonymous
""; "" for the anonymous "", another song about Mary; and "" for yet another Marian praise, "". Richart's song "" is similar to two other songs, but whether it was the model (earlier piece) or the contrafactum (later) is not clear. The two other songs are "" by Moniot de Paris, a fellow Parisian, and "" by the Moine de Saint Denis, also a local.

References
Theodore Karp. "Richart de Semilli." Grove Music Online. Oxford Music Online. Accessed 20 September 2008.

Trouvères
Musicians from Paris
Male classical composers